Antje Vollmer (31 May 194315 March 2023) was a German Protestant theologian, academic teacher and politician of the Alliance 90/The Greens. She became a member of the Bundestag in 1983 when the Greens first entered the West German parliament, before joining the party in 1985. From 1994 to 2005, she was Vice President of the Bundestag, the first Green in the position. She was a pacifist.

Education and early career 

Vollmer was born in Lübbecke (Westphalia). Her parents ran a textile shop which they later had to close. After graduating from Wittekind-Gymnasium Lübbecke in 1962, she studied Protestant theology in Berlin, Heidelberg, Tübingen, and Paris, completing her first theological exam in 1968, her second in 1971, and receiving her doctorate in 1973. From 1969 to 1971, she was a research assistant at the Kirchliche Hochschule Berlin. In 1971, she started a postgraduate course in adult education, which she completed in 1975. From 1971 to 1974, she worked as a pastor in Berlin-Wedding, a problematic district at the time. She wrote a book related to the 20 July plot together with Lars-Broder Keil, Stauffenbergs Gefährten: Das Schicksal der unbekannten Verschwörer ("Stauffenberg's companions: The fate of the unknown conspirators"), which was published in 2013.

Political career 

In the 1970s, Vollmer was politically active in the Anti-Imperialist League, close to the Maoist KPD/AO, but did not join the party. They were activists against the Vietnam War. She became a member of the Bundestag in 1983 on the ticket of the Green Party, although she was not a party member. In 1985, she joined the Greens. In 1984, she was elected to the party's board in parliament, as one of three women. In 1985, she initiated a dialogue of the state and prisoners of the Red Army Faction. Within the party, she called in "Grüner Aufbruch" for a bridge between the "Realos" and "Fundis", those adjusting to the realities of possible developments, and fundamental thinkers. Due to the party principle of rotation she had to give up the parliamentary seat in 1985, but was reelected in 1987 and again in 1994, 1998, and 2002.

In November 1994, Vollmer was the first politician of the Green Party to be elected into the Presidium of the Bundestag. She remained vice president of the Bundestag until the 2005 elections, at which point, she did not run for re-election.

Later life 

In 2009, Vollmer was awarded the Mercator Visiting Professorship for Political Management at the Universität Essen-Duisburg's NRW School of Governance. She gave both seminars and lectures at the university.

Vollmer was one of the first signatories of an open letter on the German position on the Russo-Ukrainian War, published in the magazine EMMA in April 2022, which called on Chancellor Olaf Scholz to not supply Ukraine with offensive weapons during the Russian invasion of Ukraine and to do everything he could to end the war, in order to prevent an escalation of the conflict into "a third world war".

Personal life 

In 1979, Vollmer gave birth to a son, Johann, whom she raised as a single mother.

Vollmer died on 15 March 2023, at the age of 79.

Katrin Göring-Eckardt, vice president of the Bundestag then, summarised: "She was there from the beginning and fought through much of what we benefit from today. And she kept her own head, unbending!" ("Sie war von Beginn an dabei und hat Vieles von dem durchgekämpft, wovon wir heute profitieren. Und sie hat ihren eigenen Kopf behalten, unbeugsam!)

Awards

Source:

 1989 Carl von Ossietzky Medal
 1996 Cicero Speaker Prize
 1997 Charles University Medal in Prague
 1998 Hannah Arendt Prize
 1998 Art Prize for German-Czech Understanding
 2003 Order of Tomáš Garrigue Masaryk of the Czech Republic
 2005 Commander's Cross of the Order of Merit of the Federal Republic of Germany

Publications

Dissertation

References

Further reading

External links

  
 Antje Vollmer (in German) Bundestag
 Antje Vollmer (in German) fembio.org
 : Mythen in Tüten. (in German) in: konkret, January 1996.
 Marianne Bäumler: Erlebte Geschichten mit Antje Vollmer, in the series Erlebte Geschichten of WDR 5, 1 January 2013 (podcast).

1943 births
2023 deaths
People from Lübbecke
Alliance 90/The Greens politicians
Members of the Bundestag for Hesse
Members of the Bundestag for North Rhine-Westphalia
Members of the Bundestag 2002–2005
Members of the Bundestag 1998–2002
Members of the Bundestag 1994–1998
Aufstehen
Studienstiftung alumni
Female members of the Bundestag
20th-century German women politicians
21st-century German women politicians
Commanders Crosses of the Order of Merit of the Federal Republic of Germany
Recipients of the Order of Tomáš Garrigue Masaryk